The 2005–06 Harvard Crimson women's ice hockey team represented Harvard University. The Crimson won the ECAC tournament championship and appeared in the NCAA tournament. The Crimson had to endure the absence of three players (Caitlin Cahow, Julie Chu, Sarah Vaillancourt) during the entire season as they were in training to participate in ice hockey at the 2006 Winter Olympics.

Player stats
Note: GP= Games played; G= Goals; A= Assists; PTS = Points; GW = Game Winning Goals; PPL = Power Play Goals; SHG = Short Handed Goals

2006 ECAC Tournament

Awards and honors
 Sarah Wilson, 2006 ECAC Tournament Most Valuable Player,

References

External links
Official Site

Harvard Crimson women's ice hockey seasons
Harvard
Har
Harvard Crimson women's ice hockey
Harvard Crimson women's ice hockey
Harvard Crimson women's ice hockey
Harvard Crimson women's ice hockey